Camilo Pancratius "Pikoy" Pascua Cascolan (born November 10, 1964) is a Filipino retired law enforcement officer who served as the 24th Chief of the Philippine National Police (PNP). He was the first Cordilleran to lead the country's national police force.

Cascolan has served five years with the Philippine Constabulary and 28 years with the PNP. He graduated from the Philippine Military Academy in 1986 and joined the police force in 1992. He has served as chief of police in three municipalities in Iloilo in the 1990s and the city of Taguig in the late 2000s. He then rose through the ranks to become Provincial Director of the Compostela Valley (now Davao de Oro) Police in 2012, Regional Deputy Chief of the former Autonomous Region in Muslim Mindanao Police in 2015, Regional Deputy Chief of the Western Visayas Police in 2016, and Regional Director of National Capital Region Police in 2018. He then held key leadership positions within the PNP and served as Deputy Chief for Operations of the PNP from 2019 to 2020 and Deputy Chief for Administration in 2020 before becoming the country's police chief.

Cascolan has been appointed an undersecretary of the Department of Health (DOH) on 23 October 2022.

Early life and education
Cascolan was born on November 10, 1964 in the city of Baguio in what was then the undivided Mountain Province (now the province of Benguet). He was initially educated at Maryknoll Convent School and later attended the University of the Philippines Baguio High School. Cascolan had originally planned to enter the priesthood, but eventually chose to pursue a military career upon his parents' advice. He signed up for the Philippine Military Academy in 1982 and graduated with the Sinagtala Class of 1986, whose alumni included his predecessors in the national police, Archie Gamboa, Oscar Albayalde and Bato de la Rosa.

Cascolan later earned a Master of Public Administration degree from the University of the Philippines Visayas in 1995.

Military career
Cascolan's first assignment after completing military school in Baguio was with the then-Philippine Constabulary Special Action Force of Central Mindanao (former Region XII) based in Parang, Maguindanao from July to December 1987. He served as a S2/3 officer deployed in the operations against the secessionist Moro Islamic Liberation Front. He was then assigned to the 324th Public Company and Reconnaissance Company in Iloilo province where he would spend most of his junior and mid-level military career.

In April 1988, Cascolan was assigned as an aide-de-camp to the Western Visayas (Region VI) Regional Command, returning briefly to his former reconnaissance battalion in March 1990 before assuming the command of the 2nd Iloilo Citizen Armed Force Geographical Unit (CAFGU) active auxiliary unit in 1992. He also eventually served as officer-in-charge of the 324th Public Company and the Regional Command VI before his designation as executive officer and section leader of the Iloilo Strike Force in the same year.

Police career
Cascolan began his law enforcement career in May 1992 when he joined the newly formed Philippine National Police as station chief of Barotac Nuevo, still in Iloilo province. His next police assignments in the province were as commanding officer of the 1st Iloilo Provincial Mobile Group in Tigbauan in August 1994, group director of the 3rd mobile group in Sara in August 1997, chief of police in Ajuy in March 1998, and chief of police in Balasan in April 1998.

Cascolan was based in Metro Manila from 1999 to 2007. He served as chief of the criminal investigation, research and special studies divisions of the Philippine Center on Transnational Crime in Camp Crame until 2001 and as member of the Criminal Investigation and Detection Group until 2003. He then held various positions within the Aviation Security Group before transferring to Cebu City as chief of the Central Visayas (Region VII) ASG command in 2007. He returned to Manila the following year to assume command of the Taguig City Police Station until 2010. He then moved back to Camp Crame as case monitoring chief before being posted back to the field in Mindanao and Western Visayas.

Cascolan served as finance chief of the Davao Region Police Office based in Davao City from 2011 to 2012. He was then designated as provincial director of the former Compostela Valley province for two years. As provincial police chief, he implemented a strategic operational plan that significantly reduced the crime volume and improved crime clearance and solution through inter-agency coordination. Three of the top New People's Army fugitives in the province were arrested in 2012 under his watch. In April 2014, he returned to Davao City as regional chief of the directorial staff. His last assignment in Mindanao was as Regional Deputy Chief for Operations of the former Autonomous Region in Muslim Mindanao (ARMM) Police Office based in Cotabato City from May to December 2015. Cascolan also served briefly as regional deputy for administration of the Western Visayas Region Police Office back in Iloilo province from December 2015 to May 2016 where he received his first star rank.

Cascolan assumed the Directorate for Operations of the PNP in June 2016 upon the appointment of his mistah (batchmate in the Philippine Military Academy) Bato dela Rosa as PNP Chief. As operations director, he is credited as one of the co-authors of Operation Double Barrel that launched the Philippine Drug War. He was also instrumental in introducing home defense security through an enhanced managing police operations manual. He was promoted to two-star rank in January 2017. Cascolan was then assigned with the National Capital Region Police Office as regional director in April 2018. As Metro Manila police chief, he lobbied for an eight-hour workday for uniformed personnel and for police officers to be assigned near their residence for efficiency. He was removed from the post after only six weeks after disagreements with his predecessor and then-PNP Chief Oscar Albayalde who ordered a twelve-hour workday for all personnel. He was reassigned with the PNP Civil Security Group as a short-term director before taking on higher leadership roles in Camp Crame beginning September 2018.

Cascolan was promoted to Chief of Directorial Staff and earned his three-star rank in October 2018. He then served as Deputy Chief for Operations in October 2019 and quickly rose to the position of Deputy Chief for Administration, the number 2 man of the national police, barely four months later. As a senior police officer, he conducted the transfer of police training programs from the Philippine Public Safety College back to the Philippine National Police Academy. He also authored the Camp Crame Development Plan which aimed to decentralize the national police force offices to the provinces. He is also recognized as the brains behind the Wanted Person Information System (E-WPIS) and E-Rogue which provide online access to criminal profiles for police officers.

On September 1, 2020, Cascolan was selected by President Rodrigo Duterte as the 22nd Chief of the Philippine National Police. He took up the appointment the following day after the mandatory retirement of Archie Gamboa.

Personal life
Cascolan is married to Amelia Tanalgo of Santa Barbara, Iloilo, and they have one child together.

Awards
Cascolan received more than 180 medals throughout his military and police career. As Davao de Oro provincial police chief, he was awarded the Medalya ng Kadakilaan (PNP Heroism Medal) for his leadership and humanitarian work following the devastation of Typhoon Bopha in 2012. Cascolan is also a recipient of the 2015 Country's Outstanding Police Officers in Service (COPS) award conferred by Metrobank Foundation. In 2019, he also received the Award for Continuing Excellence and Service (ACES) from Metrobank.

  Philippine Republic Presidential Unit Citation
  People Power II Unit Citation
  Officer, Philippine Legion of Honor
  Medalya ng Katapatan sa Paglilingkod (PNP Distinguished Service Medal)
  Medalya ng Katangitanging Gawa (PNP Outstanding Achievement Medal)
   Military Commendation Medals
  Medalya ng Paglaban sa Manliligalig (PNP Anti-dissidence Campaign Medal)
  Medalya ng Pagtulong sa Nasalanta (PNP Disaster Relief and Rehabilitation Operations Campaign Medal)
  Medalya ng Paglilingkod sa Luzon (PNP Luzon Campaign Medal)

References

1964 births
Filipino police chiefs
Living people
Philippine Military Academy alumni
People from Baguio
Duterte administration personnel
University of the Philippines Visayas alumni
Philippine Military Academy Class of 1986
People of the Philippine Drug War
Recipients of the Philippine Republic Presidential Unit Citation
Recipients of the Philippine Legion of Honor